Ladoga is an unincorporated community in Washington Township, Taylor County, Iowa, United States.

History
Ladoga's population was just 8 in 1902, and 15 in 1925.

References

Unincorporated communities in Taylor County, Iowa
Unincorporated communities in Iowa